Mazanderani, Mazandarani, or Tabarian may refer to:
 Mazanderani people or Tabari people, a Caspian people in the North of Iran
 Mazanderani language or Tabarian language, an Iranian language of the Northwestern branch spoken mainly in the South Caspian region
 Mazandaran Province, a province of Iran located along the southern coast of the Caspian Sea

Surname
 Ali Asghar Mazandarani (1826–1911), Iranian cleric
 Mírzá Asadu’llah Fádil Mázandarání (1880–1957), Iranian Bahá'í scholar
 Mohammad Salih al-Mazandarani (fl. 1081 AH, 11th century AD), Shi'a Islamic commentator
 Morteza Sadouqi Mazandarani (born 1946), Iranian grand Ayatollah
 Musa ibn Khalil Mazandarani, 19th century Persian scribe and scholar

See also
 Mazanderani dance
 Mazanderani calendar
 Tabrian (disambiguation)
 Gilaki (disambiguation)

Language and nationality disambiguation pages
Iranian-language surnames